The 2016–17 Senior Women's Cricket Inter Zonal Three Day Game was the third season of India's Inter Zonal women's first-class competition. The tournament took place from 1 to 19 March 2017. Five zonal teams participated in the tournament, facing each other in a round-robin format in three-day matches. All matches took place in Chhattisgarh. Central Zone won the tournament, their third title in three years.

Squads

Source: BCCI

Competition format
The five teams played in a round-robin league, therefore playing four matches. Matches were played using a three-day format.

The league worked on a points system with positions within the divisions being based on the total points. Points were awarded as follows:

Win: 6 points. 
Tie: 3 points. 
Loss: 0 points.
Drawn (lead after first innings): 3 points 
Drawn (trail after first innings): 1 point 
Drawn (no decision on first innings): 1 point 
Abandoned without a ball bowled: 1 point

If points in the final table are equal, teams are separated by most wins, then net run rate.

Standings

Source: CricketArchive

Fixtures

Round 1

Round 2

Round 3

Round 4

Round 5

References

2016-17
2016–17 Indian women's cricket
Domestic cricket competitions in 2016–17